Alejandra Krauss Valle (born 1956) is a Chilean politician and former Minister of Planning and Cooperation.

She is the daughter of Enrique Krauss, who was the Minister of the Interior under Patricio Aylwin. She studied law at the Universidad de Chile. Krauss served as lawyer, social worker, and was the founding member of the law firm "Krauss y Donoso y Cía".

Krauss has promoted social causes in La Florida, creating "Family and Future," a social organization dedicated to family development, together with Mariana Aylwin. As a member of the Christian Democrat Party of Chile, Krauss was named Minister of Planning and Cooperation (MIDEPLAN) by President Ricardo Lagos, and she filled this post from 2000 to 2002. In 2004 Krauss stood as a candidate for town councillor for La Florida, and was elected with 10.93% of the vote.

References

1956 births
Living people
Chilean people of German descent
Government ministers of Chile
Christian Democratic Party (Chile) politicians
University of Chile alumni
Women government ministers of Chile
Chilean women lawyers